The Return of the Condor Heroes is a 2006 Chinese television series adapted from Louis Cha's novel of the same title. It is the second instalment of a trilogy produced by Zhang Jizhong, preceded by The Legend of the Condor Heroes (2003) and followed by The Heaven Sword and Dragon Saber (2009). It was first broadcast on 17 March 2006 in China and subsequently broadcast in other Asian countries such as South Korea, Taiwan and Singapore.

Synopsis
The story concerns the adventures of Yang Guo, an orphaned boy in a mid-13th Century China. From his humble beginnings, the street wise Yang Guo gets passed around from one prestigious master to another but none of them will teach him any martial arts. While escaping from the Quanzhen School's Zhao Zhijing, he meets Xiaolongnü, the girl who will become his martial arts master and eventually the love of his life.

Cast

 Huang Xiaoming as Yang Guo
 Xie Yunshan as Yang Guo (young)
 Liu Yifei as Xiaolongnü
 Wang Luoyong as Guo Jing
 Kong Lin (actress) as Huang Rong
 Jessey Meng as Li Mochou
 Yang Mi as Guo Xiang
 Kenny Bee as Gongsun Zhi
 Chen Zihan as Guo Fu
 Chen Anni as Guo Fu (young)
 Wang Ning as Wu Dunru
 Chen Yalun as Wu Dunru (young)
 Zhao Jintao as Wu Xiuwen
 Ye Qile as Wu Xiuwen (young)
 Huang Xiaolei as Shagu
 Chen Jiming as Qiu Chuji
 Liu Naiyi as Zhao Zhijing
 Jiang Yi as Ke Zhen'e
 Li Yu as Qiu Qianren
 Yang Rui as Lu Wushuang
 Ge Shimin as Lu Wushuang (young)
 Wang Jia as Cheng Ying
 Wang Jiayi as Cheng Ying (young)
 Zhao Liang as Zhou Botong
 Di Naishe as Ouyang Feng
 Yu Chenghui as Huang Yaoshi
 Dali as Hong Qigong
 Ba Yin as Jinlun Guoshi
 Gao Hu as Huodu
 Cheng Haofeng as Yin Zhiping
 Wang Weiguo as Yideng
 Fu Miao as Gongsun Lü'e
 Sun Lihua as Wanyan Ping
 Zhao Hongfei as Yelü Qi
 Tian Zhong as Lu Qingdu
 Li Mingqi as Granny Sun
 Liang Li as Yinggu
 Xiu Ge as Yin Kexi
 Zhang Hengping as Lu Youjiao
 Zhang Jizhong as Yelü Chucai
 Li Ming as Qiu Qianchi
 Yuan Yuan as Kublai Khan
 Liu Kui as Möngke Khan
 Su Mao as Wang Chuyi
 Guo Jun as Wang Chongyang
 Zhou Haodong as Lu Liding
 Heizi as Feng Mofeng
 Zhao Dandan as Hong Lingbo

Production
Shooting began in October 2004 and ended in May 2005. Locations include Zhejiang, Chongqing, Shandong, Guangdong, Liaoning, Beijing and Sichuan Jiuzhaigou Valley.

Scenes from The Legend of the Condor Heroes (2003) were featured as flashbacks including the scene depicting Yang Kang's death. Zhou Jie makes a cameo appearance as Yang Kang.

Soundtrack
The music for the series was taken from motion picture scores of films such as Terminator 2: Judgment Day, Independence Day, The Day After Tomorrow, Van Helsing, Master and Commander: The Far Side of the World, Harry Potter (film series) and Batman Begins.

The chorus from Iwasaki Taku's Shades of Revolution, a Rurouni Kenshin OVA musical score, was used in a minor fight scene between Yang Guo and Li Mochou (episode 30).

The melody of the song Dearest by Ayumi Hamasaki, famous for being in InuYasha, can be heard in the background on episode 15 during the scene where Gongsun Zhi is talking to Xiaolongnü at the Passionless Valley.

The melody used for condor appearances was taken from Hans Zimmer's "All of them", notable for being part of the OST of the 2004 film King Arthur.

Track listing

The original soundtrack was released on 13 May 2006 from Rock Records Co., LTD (滾石國際音樂股份有限公司). There are two versions of the soundtrack. The mainland Chinese release contains a total of 15 tracks while the Taiwanese release includes two bonus tracks. The original score was composed by Chen Huanchang (Xiaochong).

References

External links
 
  The Return of the Condor Heroes on Sina.com
  The Return of the Condor Heroes official page on CTV website
  The Return of the Condor Heroes official page on TVB website
  The Return of the Condor Heroes official page on Ciwen website
  The Return of the Condor Heroes official page on MAXAM website

2006 Chinese television series debuts
2006 Chinese television series endings
Chinese wuxia television series
Television shows based on The Return of the Condor Heroes
Television series set in the Southern Song
Television series set in the Mongol Empire
Sequel television series
Television series about orphans
Mandarin-language television shows
China Central Television original programming
Television series by Ciwen Media